The British Educational Research Association (BERA) is a member-led charity to encourage educational research and its application. It was founded in 1974.

BERA hold conferences, publishing research, and paying for research. The association is open to researchers from any discipline. Their publications have become a well-known fixture for educational research, and provide an interdisciplinary approach that includes: "reports of experiments and surveys, discussions of conceptual and methodological issues and of underlying assumptions in educational research, accounts of research in progress, and book reviews."

It is governed by an elected council with its president serving a two-year term. It is run on a daily basis by a permanent office staff, headed by Nick Johnson.

Publications and awards

Publications
Research Intelligence
British Educational Research Journal
British Journal of Educational Technology
Review of Education
Research Guidelines

They have irregularly published material, and discontinued material that can be purchased from some book companies.

Awards
 Meeting of Minds Fellowships
 BERA Doctoral Thesis Award
 BERA Masters Dissertation Award
 BERA Brian Simon Fellowship
 BERA John Nisbet Fellowship
 BCF/ BERA/ Routledge Curriculum Journal Prize
 BJET Fellowship
 BERJ Paper of the Year
 Curriculum Journal Paper of the Year

References

External links
BERA Home page
Catalogue of the BERA archives, held at the Modern Records Centre, University of Warwick

Education policy in the United Kingdom
Educational organisations based in the United Kingdom
Organisations based in the London Borough of Camden
Professional associations based in the United Kingdom
Scholarly communication
Social sciences organizations
University College London
Organizations with year of establishment missing